Aleksandr Vyacheslavovich Stepanov (born 5 June 1996) is a Russian football player who plays for FC Amkar Perm.

Club career
Stepanov made his debut in the Russian Professional Football League for FC Dynamo-2 Moscow on 20 July 2016 in a game against FC Tekstilshchik Ivanovo.

Stepanov made his Russian Football National League debut for FC Volgar Astrakhan on 15 July 2017 in a game against FC Rotor Volgograd.

On 30 August 2020, Lori FC announced the signing of Stepanov to a one-year contract with the option of another.

References

External links
 Profile by Russian Professional Football League

1996 births
Sportspeople from Moscow Oblast
Living people
Russian footballers
Association football defenders
FC Dynamo Moscow reserves players
FC Volgar Astrakhan players
FC Lori players
FC Van players
FC Amkar Perm players
Russian First League players
Russian Second League players
Armenian Premier League players
Russian expatriate footballers
Expatriate footballers in Armenia
Russian expatriate sportspeople in Armenia